Eulogio Ramiro Martínez (11 June 1935 – 30 September 1984) was a Paraguayan-born footballer who played as a striker. He played for the Spanish side FC Barcelona in the 1950s and 1960s, and is remembered for being a prolific striker with an excellent finishing ability.

He was reputed to be the creator of the "Martinez Turn", which can be seen on Movietone footage of Barcelona's quarter-final match against Wolves in the 1959–60 European Cup. This move later received worldwide acclaim as the "Cruyff Turn" and although Johan Cruyff was at Barcelona when he demonstrated it in the 1974 World Cup, Martinez has never received any credit despite using it at least 14 years earlier.

Club career

Years at Barcelona
After leading Club Libertad to a Paraguayan League title in 1955, Martínez drew the attention of FC Barcelona who eventually signed him in 1956. Martínez soon showcased his talent in Barcelona by leading the team in scoring in three seasons (1956–57, 1957–58, 1959–60), obtaining two Spanish League titles, two Copas del Rey and two Inter-Cities Fairs Cups.

Martínez also became part of FC Barcelona's history by scoring the first goal ever at their current stadium, Camp Nou, on 24 September 1957. The goal was scored in the 11th minute, in a friendly match celebrating the inauguration of the stadium against a Polish team. Barcelona won the match 4–2.

Another impressive accomplishment by Martínez while playing for FC Barcelona was when he scored seven goals in one match, in an 8–1 victory over Atlético Madrid in a Copa del Rey tie played on 1 May 1957.

Post-Barça Years
Hampered by being overweight, he left FC Barcelona in 1962, having scored 111 goals in 162 official matches. He went on to play for Elche, Atlético Madrid, and CE Europa.

Club statistics

International career
Martínez played for both Paraguay and Spain. For Paraguay he had 9 caps and 4 goals. For Spain he had 8 caps and 6 goals, and was part of the Spanish team that played at the 1962 FIFA World Cup. He played the opening game, a 1–0 defeat against Czechoslovakia, but was dropped from the team afterwards.

Spain International goals

After retirement
After retiring in 1966, he established himself in the Catalan town of Calella. In 1984, he was run down by a car while changing a flat tire. He spent 23 days in a coma before dying on 30 September 1984.

Honours
Club Libertad
Paraguayan League: 1955

FC Barcelona
Inter-Cities Fairs Cup: 1955–58, 1958–60
Spanish League: 1958–59, 1959–60
Spanish Cup: 1956–57, 1958–59

Atlético Madrid
Spanish Cup: 1964–65

See also
List of Spain international footballers born outside Spain

References

External links
 
 National team data 
 
 FC Barcelona archives 
 FC Barcelona profile
 

1935 births
1984 deaths
Paraguayan emigrants to Spain
Paraguayan footballers
Sportspeople from Asunción
Spanish footballers
Association football forwards
La Liga players
Club Libertad footballers
FC Barcelona players
Elche CF players
Atlético Madrid footballers
CE Europa footballers
Paraguayan expatriate footballers
Dual internationalists (football)
Paraguay international footballers
Spain B international footballers
Spain international footballers
Catalonia international guest footballers
1962 FIFA World Cup players
Road incident deaths in Spain